The Campina do Encantado State Park is a state park in the state of São Paulo, Brazil.

Location

The Campina do Encantado State Park is in the municipality of Pariquera-Açu, São Paulo.
The park is in the lower Ribeira de Iguape River valley, between the Pariquera-Açu and Pariquera-Mirim rivers.
There are no residents, although there is considerable pressure from the surrounding communities.
The main focus of the park is on environmental education. The park has a visitor center with an audiovisual room, lodgings for researchers and technicians, a kiosk with a barbecue, a tank of native fish, a nursery of native plants and a computerized weather station.

History

Privately owned land within the present park boundaries was occupied decades ago, but since then the vegetation has completely regenerated.
At the request of the consultative council, the park was renamed the Campina do Encantado State Park on 26 May 1999.
The management plan was prepared by the São Paulo State Foundation for Forest Conservation and Production (Fundação para a Conservação e a Produção Florestal do Estado de São Paulo).
It was approved on 21 October 2009.
The park is part of the Lagamar mosaic of conservation units.

Archaeology

There are several archaeological sites, middens containing fragments of shells, bones and other objects.
The shell mounds are between 5,870 and 4,974 years old.
The sea was higher when the mounds were formed, and there was an extensive network of lagoons in the area that reached its maximum extent about 5,100 year ago.

Environment

The environment has been preserved because 50% is subject to periodic flooding and 25% is permanently flooded, cutting off access to the 25% that is higher arable land.
Vegetation is dominated by restinga forest, swamp forest and várzea forest.
The flora is rich in Bromeliaceaes and Araceaes.
The park has diverse fauna, including the endangered red-tailed amazon (Amazona brasiliensis).

Notes

Sources

State parks of Brazil
Protected areas of São Paulo (state)
1994 establishments in Brazil